The men's long jump at the 2019 World Para Athletics Championships was held at the Dubai Club for People with Determination in Dubai from 7–15 November.

Medalists

Events listed in pink were contested but no medals were awarded.

Detailed results

T11

The event was held on 10 November.

T12

The event was held on 7 November.

T13

The event was held on 12 November.

T20

T36

T37

T38

T47

T63

T64

See also
List of IPC world records in athletics

References

long jump
2019 in men's athletics
Long jump at the World Para Athletics Championships